General Haji Abubaker Jeje Odongo is a Ugandan senior military officer and politician. In June 2021, he was appointed Uganda's cabinet minister for Foreign Affairs.

He has previously served as Minister of Internal Affairs in the Cabinet of Uganda from 2016 to 2022. Previously he served as Minister of State for Defence from February 2009 to June 2016.

History
Jeje Odongo was born in Amuria District, in the Teso sub-region, in Eastern Uganda. He attended secondary school at Ngora High School. He entered the Ugandan army in 1979. He is one of the original twenty seven combatants who, together with Yoweri Museveni, attacked Kabamba Military Barracks in February 1981 to start the Ugandan Bush War, a guerrilla war that lasted from February 1981 until April 1986. Jeje Odongo was captured soon after the first NRA operation and was imprisoned in Luzira Maximum Security Prison.

In 1994, Jeje Odongo was one of the ten army officers who represented the Ugandan military in the Constituent Assembly that drafted the 1995 Ugandan Constitution. In 1996, he was selected to replace Colonel Sserwanga Lwanga as the Political Commissar in the Uganda People's Defense Force (UPDF). Also in 1996, he contested the parliamentary seat for Amuria District in the Ugandan Parliament. He won and was appointed as Minister of Defence soon after he entered parliament.

In 1998, he resigned his parliamentary seat and his cabinet position and was appointed Commander of the Army, taking over from Major General Mugisha Muntu. He served as army commander until 2001, when he was replaced by Major General James Kazini. In 2001, he was appointed as Minister without Portfolio, a position he occupied until 2004. In 2004, now at the rank of Lieutenant General, Jeje Odongo was appointed as Minister of State for the Environment.

Between 2001 and 2006, he was one of 10 senior UPDF officers  who represented the Ugandan military in the 8th Ugandan Parliament. In May 2008, Jeje Odongo graduated with the degree of Master of Arts in International Relations and Diplomacy from Nkumba University. On 16 February 2009, he was promoted to General and appointed Minister of State for Defence. After seven years in that post, he was instead appointed as Minister of Internal Affairs in the cabinet list announced on 6 June 2016.

On 18 February 2022 he participated in the European Union - African Union Summit in Brussels. A controversy arose when he greeted President of the European Commission, Ursula von der Leyen, only after an intervention by Emmanuel Macron, which was considered a misogynistic attitude.

References

External links
  Jeje Odongo Implicated in Illegal Detention of Traders

Living people
People from Amuria District
Ugandan Muslims
1951 births
People from Eastern Region, Uganda
Members of the Parliament of Uganda
Itesot people
Ugandan generals
Ugandan military personnel
Nkumba University alumni
Government ministers of Uganda
People from Teso sub-region
National Resistance Movement politicians
21st-century Ugandan politicians
Foreign Ministers of Uganda